Erin F. Moriarty (born April 6, 1952) is an American television news reporter and correspondent. She works as a correspondent for 48 Hours Mystery. She has won national Emmy Awards several times.

Early life
Moriarty attended Upper Arlington High School in Columbus, Ohio, and is a Phi Beta Kappa graduate of Ohio State University, where she was also a sister of Kappa Kappa Gamma and was selected to Mortar Board National College Senior Honor Society. She received a J.D. degree from Ohio State University Moritz College of Law and is licensed to practice law in Ohio, Washington, D.C., and Maryland.

Career
In 1979-1980, Moriarty worked as a reporter for a Columbus-based NBC affiliate WCMH-TV.  She also cohosted the local PM Magazine program with Steve Shannon at WCMH-TV. In 1980-1982 for the Baltimore-based CBS (at the time, ABC) affiliate WJZ-TV and in 1982-1983, for CBS affiliate WJKW-TV in Cleveland.

From 1983-86, Moriarty served as a consumer reporter for WMAQ-TV in Chicago. In 1986, she joined CBS News where she has served as a consumer correspondent for CBS This Morning and the CBS Evening News with Dan Rather. In 1990, she joined the CBS News program 48 Hours as a correspondent.

Moriarty has collaborated with colleague Nancy Giles on two weekly public-affairs radio series under the Giles and Moriarty banner, one for WPHT in Philadelphia in 2003-04 and another for Greenstone Media in 2007. Both shows were produced at the facilities of the CBS Radio Network.

In 2008, Moriarty co-authored "Death of a Dream" with Paul LaRosa, a CBS News producer. The book examines the 2005 murder of dancer Catherine Woods in New York, and the subsequent trial and conviction of Paul Cortez.

She has also been seen narrating recent episodes of 48 Hours Mystery.

Awards
 9-time national Emmy Award winner
 Recipient of the 2001 Overseas Press Club Award
 2-time winner of the Association of Women in Radio and Television Gracie Allen Award
 Top 100 Award from Irish Magazine honoree
 Recipient of the Outstanding Consumer Media Service Award presented by the Consumer Federation of America
 Recipient of the Crime Hottie Award presented by True Crime Uncensored.

Personal life
Moriarty lives in New York City with her husband, who is also an attorney, and their son.

References

American lawyers
American reporters and correspondents
American television journalists
American women television journalists
Emmy Award winners
Living people
Ohio State University alumni
Ohio State University Moritz College of Law alumni
1952 births
Place of birth missing (living people)
Moriarty, Erin
21st-century American women